The Prince-Bishopric of Würzburg was an ecclesiastical principality of the Holy Roman Empire located in Lower Franconia, west of the Prince-Bishopric of Bamberg. Würzburg had been a diocese since 743. As established by the Concordat of 1448, bishops in Germany were chosen by the canons of the cathedral chapter and their election was later confirmed by the pope. Following a common practice in Germany, the prince-bishops of Würzburg were frequently elected to other ecclesiastical principalities as well. The last few prince-bishops resided at the Würzburg Residence, which is one of the grandest Baroque palaces in Europe.

As a consequence of the 1801 Treaty of Lunéville, Würzburg, along with the other ecclesiastical states of Germany, was secularized in 1803 and absorbed into the Electorate of Bavaria. In the same year Ferdinand III, former Grand Duke of Tuscany, was compensated with the Electorate of Salzburg. In the 1805 Peace of Pressburg, Ferdinand lost Salzburg to the Austrian Empire, but was compensated with the new Grand Duchy of Würzburg, Bavaria having relinquished the territory in return for the Tyrol. This new state lasted until 1814, when it was once again annexed by Bavaria.

The Roman Catholic Diocese of Würzburg was reestablished in 1821 without temporal power.

Duke of Franconia
In 1115, Henry V awarded the territory of Eastern Franconia (Ostfranken) to his nephew Conrad of Hohenstaufen, who used the title "Duke of Franconia". Franconia remained a Hohenstaufen power base until 1168, when the Bishop of Würzburg was formally ceded the ducal rights in Eastern Franconia. The name "Franconia" fell out of usage, but the bishop revived it in his own favour in 1442 and held it until the reforms of Napoleon Bonaparte abolished it.

Coat of arms

The charge of the original coat of arms showed the "Rennfähnlein" banner, quarterly argent and gules, on a lance or, in bend, on a blue shield.
In the 14th century another coat of arms was created, the "Rechen" or rake. The coat of arms represents the holism of heaven and earth. The three white pikes represent the Trinity of God and the four red pikes, directed to earth, stand for the four points of the compass, representing the whole spread of earth. The red colour represents the blood of Christ.

The prince-bishops used both within their personal coat of arms. The Rechen and the Rennfähnlein represented the diocese, while the other (usually two) fields showed the personal coat of arms of the bishop's family. The coat of arms showed the Rechen in the first and third field, the Rennfähnlein in the second and fourth field.

Prince-Bishops of Würzburg, 1168–1803 

Herold von Hochheim 1165–1170
Reginhard von Abenberg 1171–1186
Gottfried I von Spitzenberg-Helfenstein 1186–1190
Philip of Swabia 1190–1191
Heinrich III of Berg 1191–1197
Gottfried II von Hohenlohe 1197
Konrad von Querfurt 1198–1202
Heinrich IV von Katzburg 1202–1207
 1207–1223
Dietrich von Homburg 1223–1225
Hermann I von Lobdeburg 1225–1254
Iring von Reinstein-Homburg 1254–1266
Heinrich V von Leiningen 1254–1255
Poppo III von Trimberg 1267–1271
Berthold I von Henneberg 1271–1274
Berthold II von Sternberg 1274–1287
Mangold von Neuenburg 1287–1303 (Bishop of Bamberg 1285)
Andreas von Gundelfingen 1303–1313
Gottfried III von Hohenlohe 1313–1322
Friedrich von Stolberg 1313–1317
Wolfram Wolfskeel von Grumbach 1322–1332
Hermann II Hummel von Lichtenberg 1333–1335
Otto II von Wolfskeel 1335–1345
Albrecht I von Hohenberg 1345–1349
Albrecht II von Hohenlohe 1350–1372
Gerhard von Schwarzburg 1372–1400
Albrecht III von Katzburg 1372–1376
Johann I von Egloffstein 1400–1411
Johann II von Brunn 1411–1440
Sigmund of Saxony 1440–1443
Gottfried I von Limpurg 1443–1455
Johann III von Grumbach 1455–1466
Rudolf II von Scherenberg 1466–1495
Lorenz von Bibra 1495–1519
Konrad von Thüngen 1519–1540
Conrad von Bibra 1540–1544
Melchior Zobel von Giebelstadt 1544–1558
Friedrich von Wirsberg 1558–1573
Julius Echter von Mespelbrunn 1573–1617
Johann Gottfried von Aschhausen 1617–1622 (Bishop of Bamberg 1609–1622)
Philipp Adolf von Ehrenberg 1622–1631
Franz von Hatzfeld 1631–1642 (Bishop of Bamberg 1633–1642)
Johann Philipp von Schönborn 1642–1673
Johann Hartmann von Rosenbach 1673–1675
Peter Philipp von Dernbach 1675–1683
Konrad Wilhelm von Wernau 1683–1684
Johann Gottfried II von Gutenberg 1684–1698
Johann Philipp von Greifenclau zu Vollraths 1699–1719
Johann Philipp Franz von Schönborn 1719–1725
Christoph Franz von Hutten 1724–1729
Friedrich Karl von Schönborn 1729–1746 (also Bishop of Bamberg)
Anselm Franz von Ingelheim 1746–1749
Karl Philipp von Greifenclau zu Vollraths 1749–1754
Adam Friedrich von Seinsheim 1755–1779 (Bishop of Bamberg 1757–1779)
Franz Ludwig von Erthal 1779–1795 (also Bishop of Bamberg)
Georg Karl Ignaz von Fechenbach zu Laudenbach 1795–1808

Secular power lost in 1803. Territory ceded to Bavaria until 1805.

See also
 Würzburg Cathedral – for burial locations of most Würzburg bishops
 Ebrach Abbey – beginning with the 13th century, the bishops of Würzburg had their hearts brought to Ebrach Abbey (entrails to the Marienkirche, bodies to Würzburg cathedral). About 30 hearts of bishops, some of which had been desecrated during the German Peasants' War, are said to have found their final resting place at Ebrach. Prince-Bishop Julius Echter von Mespelbrunn broke with this tradition and had his heart buried in the Neubaukirche at Würzburg.

Gallery

Notes

References

Further reading 
 Peter Kolb und Ernst-Günther Krenig (Hrsg.): Unterfränkische Geschichte. Würzburg 1989.
 Alfred Wendehorst: Das Bistum Würzburg Teil 1: Die Bischofsreihe bis 1254. Germania Sacra, NF 1: Die Bistümer der Kirchenprovinz Mainz, Berlin 1962.
 Alfred Wendehorst: Das Bistum Würzburg Teil 2 - Die Bischofsreihe von 1254 bis 1455. In: Max-Planck-Institut für Geschichte (Hg.): Germania Sacra - Neue Folge 4 - Die Bistümer der Kirchenprovinz Mainz. Berlin 1969. .
 Alfred Wendehorst: Das Bistum Würzburg Teil 3: Die Bischofsreihe von 1455 bis 1617. Germania Sacra, NF 13: Die Bistümer der Kirchenprovinz Mainz, Berlin/New York 1978.
 Alfred Wendehorst: Das Bistum Würzburg 1803-1957. Würzburg 1965.
 Wissenschaftliche Vereinigung für den Deutschen Orden e.V. und Historische Deutschorden-Compaigne zu Mergentheim 1760 e.V. (Hrsg.): 1300 Jahre Würzburg - Zeichen der Geschichte, Bilder und Siegel der Bischöfe von Würzburg. Heft 23. Lauda-Königshofen 2004.

1160s establishments in the Holy Roman Empire
1168 establishments in Europe
1803 disestablishments in the Holy Roman Empire
States and territories established in 1168
Bishopric
Prince-bishoprics of the Holy Roman Empire in Germany
743 establishments
Dioceses established in the 8th century
Franconian Circle

la:Dioecesis Herbipolitana